Francisco Jovel Álvarez Rivera (born November 24, 1982, in El Salvador) is a Salvadoran professional footballer, who currently plays as a defender.

Club career

Municipal Limeño
He started his career at his hometown club Municipal Limeño in 2001.

Atlético Chaparrastique
He signed with Atlético Chaparrastique in 2004.

Alianza FC
In 2005, Álvarez signed with Alianza F.C.

Águila
After a short-lived spell with Luis Ángel Firpo, he moved to Águila in 2009.

Vista Hermosa
In 2011, Álvarez signed with Vista Hermosa.

Third return to Municipal Limeño
After a short spell in 2005, Álvarez signed again with Municipal Limeño in 2012.

Isidro Metapán
In July 2013, Álvarez signed with A.D. Isidro Metapán for the Apertura 2013.

Fourth return to Municipal Limeño
In 2017, Álvaro signed again with Municipal Limeño.

International career
Álvarez made his debut for El Salvador in an April 2007 friendly match against Haiti and has earned a total of 3 caps, scoring no goals. He has represented his country at the 2007 CONCACAF Gold Cup.

His final international was a November 2007 friendly match against Jamaica.

Honours

Club 
C.D. Águila
 Primera División
 Runners-up: Apertura 2009, Clausura 2010

A.D. Isidro Metapán
 Primera División
 Champion: Apertura 2013, Clausura 2014, Apertura 2014
 Runners-up: Clausura 2015

References

External links
 Francisco Jovel Álvarez at Soccerway 

1982 births
Living people
People from La Unión Department
Association football forwards
Salvadoran footballers
El Salvador international footballers
2007 CONCACAF Gold Cup players
Alianza F.C. footballers
C.D. Vista Hermosa footballers
C.D. Luis Ángel Firpo footballers
C.D. Águila footballers